The Air Indiana Flight 216 crash occurred on December 13, 1977, at 19:22 CST, when a Douglas DC-3, registration N51071 carrying the University of Evansville basketball team, crashed on takeoff at the Evansville Regional Airport in Evansville, Indiana. The aircraft lost control and crashed shortly after lift-off.  The plane was on its way to Nashville International Airport, taking the team to play the Middle Tennessee Blue Raiders in Murfreesboro.

The National Transportation Safety Board blamed the crash on the pilot's failure to remove gust locks on the right aileron and the rudder before takeoff, as well as an overloaded baggage compartment. The NTSB report said that the plane might have been able to stay airborne had only one of the problems existed. As it was, the extra baggage shifted the plane's center of gravity to the back end, and the locked rudder and aileron made it impossible to control the overweight aircraft.

The only member of the Purple Aces who did not die in the crash was 18-year-old freshman David Furr; he was out for the season with an ankle injury and thus was not on the plane that day. But just two weeks after the crash, Furr and his younger brother Byron were killed in a car accident near Newton, Illinois, leaving the entire 1977 Evansville team dead.

A memorial has been constructed at the University of Evansville known as the "Weeping Basketball." On stone slabs are engraved the names of the players who were killed, including Furr. (The final name on the monument is that of Charles Goad of the Goad Equipment Company, invited on the flight by his friend Bob Hudson.) Also engraved is an excerpt from the eulogy delivered by school president Wallace Graves at a memorial service: "Out of the agony of this hour we will rise."

Flight crew
Airplane crew:
Pilot - Ty Van Pham (aged 42)
Copilot - Gaston Ruiz (aged 35)

See also
List of accidents involving sports teams
Air Midwest Flight 5481, an accident where maintenance errors combined with aircraft overloading to cause a stall and crash.
Fine Air Flight 101, a DC-8 that was improperly loaded with the center of gravity shifted towards the back. Because loaders did not give the crew the proper information with regards to how the aircraft was loaded, the pilots improperly set their trim for takeoff. The plane immediately stalled and crashed after departure.

References

Evansville Purple Aces men's basketball
Aviation accidents and incidents in the United States in 1977
Aviation accidents and incidents in Indiana
1977 in Indiana
1977–78 NCAA Division I men's basketball season
Accidents and incidents involving the Douglas DC-3
Aviation accidents and incidents involving sports teams
December 1977 events in the United States